U.S. Route 17 (US 17) in the U.S. state of North Carolina is a north–south highway that is known as the Coastal Highway in the southeastern half of the state and the Ocean Highway in other areas. The route enters the state from South Carolina near Calabash, and leaves in the vicinity of the Great Dismal Swamp National Wildlife Refuge in Virginia.

Route description
US 17 enters Brunswick County in Carolina Shores amid a variety of golf course communities. Carolina Shores was part of Calabash until 1998.

In Wilmington, US 17 (here concurrent with US 76 and US 421) crosses the Cape Fear River between New Hanover County and Brunswick County over the Cape Fear Memorial Bridge. US 17 then travels east through the city of Wilmington with US 76 on Wooster/Dawson Streets and Oleander Drive, intersecting US 117, NC 132 and US 74. At the end of the US 76 concurrency near Wrightsville Beach, US 17 travels north as Military Cutoff Road before meeting up with Market Street and US 17 Business and exiting the city northeast. North of Holly Ridge US 17 begins to move further away from the Atlantic Coast. Then, it bypasses Jacksonville along with NC 24. Between New Bern and James City, US 17 (concurrent with US 70 and NC 55) crosses the Trent River by way of the Freedom Memorial Bridge. Farther east, between James City and Bridgeton, US 17, still concurrent with NC 55, crosses the Neuse River over the Neuse River Bridge.  Traffic going north on US 17 when using US 70's concurrency can bypass New Bern altogether via NC 43, ironically both the west end of US 17's concurrency on US 70 and NC 43's southern terminus both, respectively have a north and south protrusion of unused highway since full cloverleaf junctions were scrapped in the area.

US 17 bypasses Washington, and it crosses the Pamlico River over the Pamlico-Tar River Bridge shortly before the route intersects with US 264. Farther along in Bear Grass, US 17 joins a concurrency with a limited-access portion of US 13/US 64, although US 64 moves east before US 13/US 17 reaches Williamston, where the limited-access segment ends. US 13/US 17 uses the Roanoke River Bridge to cross the Roanoke River, then before US 13 moves onto the interchange with North King Street it crosses the Cashie River Bridge over the Cashie River at Windsor. At the Bertie County-Chowan County line, US 17 traverses the Chowan River from Edenhouse to Edenton. East of Edenton, US 17 shares a concurrency with NC 37 until they reach Hertford where it branches off to the northwest onto US 17 Business. US 17 crosses the Perquimans River via the Perquimans River Bridge. Between Perquimans County and Pasquotank County, US 17 crosses the Little River over the Little River Bridge.  A bypass route splits off to the northwest as US 17 (Mainline) continues into Elizabeth City as Hughes Boulevard, picking up concurrency with US 158 until US 158 splits off to the west at Morgan's Corner.  US 17 crosses the Pasquotank River between Morgan's Corner in Pasquotank County and South Mills in Camden County, before entering Virginia adjacent to the Great Dismal Swamp National Wildlife Refuge.

History

US 17 was established in 1927, traversing from South Carolina, near Fair Bluff, to Virginia, near South Mills.  Its routing was placed along the following state highways:  NC 202, from the South Carolina state line to Chadbourn; NC 20, from Chadbourn to Wilmington; NC 30, from Wilmington to Windsor; NC 342, from Windsor to Elizabeth City; NC 34, from Elizabeth City to Morgans Corner; and NC 341, from Morgans Corner to the Virginia state line.

In May 2015, AASHTO approved a request to reroute US 17 back through Wilmington, following US 76 along Oleander Drive and Military Cutoff Road.  The justification for the route change was to better serve industry and commerce.  In May 2017, US 17 was officially rerouted through Wilmington, ending its northern bypass route.

Interstate proposals
As a major north-south corridor through the coastal area, US 17 has been the target of various Interstate Highway proposals over the years. The earliest known proposal was in 1964, with a proposal supported by then-governor Terry Sanford, was to build a new Interstate from Fayetteville to Norfolk, Virginia, via US 13 and US 17. Designated Interstate 13 (I-13), it received support from various local officials; but was not supported by the North Carolina Highway Commission, which ended discussions.

During the mid-1990s through mid-2000s, I-99 was proposed between Charleston, South Carolina and Wilmington, Delaware, completely overlapping all of US 17 in North Carolina. In 2006, the Virginia Department of Transportation (VDOT) completed a study on the feasibility of the interstate and concluded with the high cost and disinterest of other states, notably South Carolina, that it was not feasible and recommend to not pursue further.

In 2012, NCDOT backed and presented a letter to the Federal Highway Administration (FHWA) requesting the establishment of a new high priority corridor between Raleigh and Norfolk, designated I-44 (or I-50, with I-56 and I-89 as other possible numbers). This corridor follows US 64 and US 17, north of Williamston. The following year, I-495 was established east of Raleigh and was routed on part of this proposed route. In 2014, various supporters, including Governor Pat McCrory, Congressman G. K. Butterfield, NCDOT and the Regional Transportation Alliance (RTA), have made cases and written letters to federal officials in support of the new interstate corridor. In 2016, AASHTO approved designation of I-87 along US 17 between Williamston and the Virginia state line.

North Carolina Highway 341

North Carolina Highway 341 (NC 341) was an original state highway that traversed from NC 34, in Morgans Corner, to South Mills.  In 1923, it was extended north to the Virginia state line, meeting up with SR 40.  In 1927, it was completely overlapped with US 17, which subsequently replaced it outright in 1934.

Future
In Chowan County, the existing freeway section of US 17, which bypasses Edenton, will be fully upgraded to modern interstate standards.  At a cost of $13 million, it will mainly focus on widening travel lanes and building shoulders; construction is planned to start in 2025.

Junction list

Special routes

There are numerous existing and former special routes of US 17 within the state of North Carolina.

See also
 North Carolina Bicycle Route 3 - Concurrent with US 17 at multiple locations
 North Carolina Bicycle Route 5 - Concurrent with US 17 on its NC 133 concurrency

References

External links

 
 NCRoads.com: U.S. 17
 NCRoads.com: U.S. 17-A
 NCRoads.com: U.S. 17 Business
 North Carolina @ AARoads - U.S. Highway 17

17
 
Transportation in Brunswick County, North Carolina
Transportation in New Hanover County, North Carolina
Transportation in Pender County, North Carolina
Transportation in Onslow County, North Carolina
Transportation in Jones County, North Carolina
Transportation in Craven County, North Carolina
Transportation in Beaufort County, North Carolina
Transportation in Martin County, North Carolina
Transportation in Bertie County, North Carolina
Transportation in Chowan County, North Carolina
Transportation in Perquimans County, North Carolina
Transportation in Pasquotank County, North Carolina
Transportation in Camden County, North Carolina
Historic Albemarle Tour